Liotiidae is a family of small sea snails, marine gastropod mollusks in the clade Vetigastropoda (according to the taxonomy of the Gastropoda by Bouchet & Rocroi, 2005).

Description
The head of the animal is proboscidiform. The epipodial line has a pair of conical lobes and three pairs of cirri.

The white shell has a turbiniform or discoidal shape. It shows longitudinal ribs or is clathrate.  The shell shows a fine lamellar sculpture. The circular aperture is feebly nacreous. The thick  peristome is continuous and shows a callous varix. The multispiral operculum is hispid, corneous and has a soft, calcareous outer layer (intritacalx) formed of pearly beads that are disposed spirally.

Taxonomy

2005 taxonomy 
The family Liotiidae belongs to the superfamily Turbinoidea, according to the taxonomy of the Gastropoda by Bouchet & Rocroi, 2005).

This family consists of the three following subfamilies (according to the taxonomy of the Gastropoda by Bouchet & Rocroi, 2005):
 Liotiinae Gray, 1850 - synonym: Cyclostrematidae P. Fischer, 1885; McLean (1987) ranked it as subfamily of Turbinidae.
 † Brochidiinae Yochelson, 1956
 † Dichostasiinae Yochelson, 1956

2008 taxonomy 
Liotiidae was moved to the redefined superfamily Trochoidea according to Williams et al. (2008).

Genera 
Genera in this family include:
subfamily Liotiinae
 Austroliotia Cotton, 1948
 Bathyliotina Habe, 1961
 Circumstella Laseron, 1958
 Cithna A. Adams, 1863
 Cordarene S.-I Huang, C.-L. Chen & M.-H. Lin, 2018
 Cyclostrema Marryat, 1818 
 Dentarene Iredale, 1929
 † Klebyella Gründel, 1998
 Liotia Gray, 1842 - type genus
 Liotina Munier-Chalmas, 1885
 Macrarene Hertlein & Strong, 1951
 Moniliotina S.-I Huang, M.-H. Lin & C.-L. Chen, 2019
 Munditia Finlay, 1926
 Pterarene Sakurai & Habe, 1977
 Rhodinoliotia Tomlin & Shackleford, 1915
 Rufanula Barnard, 1963

subfamily † Dichostasiinae
 † Dichostasia Yochelson, 1956 - type genus of the subfamily Dichostasiinae

Not in a subfamily
 †Pareuchelus O. Boettger, 1907 
 Rotaliotina S.-I Huang, 2023

Genera brought into synonymy
 Conicella Laseron, 1954: synonym of Wanganella Laseron, 1954
 Liochrysta Laseron, 1958: synonym of Pseudoliotia Tate, 1898

References 

 Nomura, S. (1932) Mollusca from the raised beach deposits of the Kwantô region. The Science Reports of the Tôhoku Imperial University, Sendai, Japan, second series (Geology), 15, 65–141, pl. 10.
 Bouchet P., Rocroi J.P., Hausdorf B., Kaim A., Kano Y., Nützel A., Parkhaev P., Schrödl M. & Strong E.E. (2017). Revised classification, nomenclator and typification of gastropod and monoplacophoran families. Malacologia. 61(1-2): 1-526

External links 
 Gray, J. E. (1850). In: Gray, M. E., Figures of molluscous animals, selected from various authors. Longman, Brown, Green and Longmans, London. Vol. 4, iv + 219 pp. (August) 

 
Taxa named by John Edward Gray